Soroush Rafiei is an Iranian professional footballer who plays for Persian Gulf Pro League club Persepolis and the Iran national team.

Club career

Fajr Sepasi 
He started his career with Fajr Sepasi and helped them to promote to the 2011–12 Persian Gulf Cup.

Foolad 
Rafiei, 28, was a member of Foolad football team from 2011 to 2017 and helped the Ahvaz-based football team win Iran Professional League (IPL) title in 2014.

Tractor
In the summer of 2015 Rafiei signed a two–year contract with Tractor to spend his conscription period at the club. In 2016, Rafiei has been linked with a move to Greek professional football club, AEK Athens in the next transfer window. Also, Persian giants Persepolis and Esteghlal Tehran showed interest in him.

Persepolis

On 9 January 2017, Rafiei signed a 6-month contract with Persian Gulf Pro League club Persepolis. He was given the number 7, which had previously been retired in honor of club legend Ali Parvin. He scored a goal against Esteghlal in 84th Tehran Derby. Rafiee returned to Persepolis for 2018–19 but due to fifa ban, he loaned to Foolad till winter.

Al-Khor 
Before June 2017, news and rumours linked Rafiei with a move to Al Sadd. But before start of 2017–18 season, Rafiee joined the Qatari Al-Khor football team for one year, and wore number 7 in the team. At the end of the season, Al-Khor picked up an alternate player for Rafiei and did not renew his contract with the club. He considered playing in Iran's football league more difficult than playing in Qatar.

Return to Persepolis 
On 8 July 2018, Rafiei joined Persepolis on a new 18-month deal.

Return to Foolad 
On 24 July 2018, Rafiei joined Foolad on a new 6-month deal.

Shahr Khodro 
On August 2019, Rafiei joined Shahr Khodro on a two-year deal.

Sepahan 

On 13 January 2020, Rafiei joined Sepahan S.C. on a 18-month deal. In Sepahan, he played a key role in the middle of the field. He had a high number of assists for Sepahan.

Return to Persepolis 
On 15 June 2022, Rafiei joined Persian Gulf Pro League side Persepolis on a new two-year deal. This was his third contract with Persepolis.

Career statistics

Club

International career

He was called up to the Iran national football team in October 2014 by Carlos Queiroz. He made his debut in a match against South Korea on 18 November 2014. He was called into Iran's 2015 AFC Asian Cup squad on 30 December 2014 by Carlos Queiroz. In May 2018 he was named in Iran's preliminary squad for the 2018 World Cup in Russia but did not make the final 23.

Style of play 

Rafiei is a technical playmaker. In Iranian sports media, he has been mentioned as "a midfielder who dribbles as cool as ever and his playing is just enough".

Argentinian manager and former player, Gabriel Calderón criticized his style of play due to "lack of speed" in his game plan.

Personal life 
Soroush Rafiei was born in Shiraz, Iran and started playing football in his hometown. He has announced that he has been a fan of Persepolis since he was a child.

Honours

Foolad
Persian Gulf Pro League (1): 2013–14
Persepolis
Persian Gulf Pro League (2): 2016–17, 2018–19
Hazfi Cup (1): 2018–19
Iranian Super Cup (1): 2019

Individual
Persian Gulf Pro League Team of the Year (3) : 2013–14 , 2015–16 , 2016-17

References

External links

Soroush Rafiei at PersianLeague.com

1990 births
Living people
People from Shiraz
Fajr Sepasi players
Foolad FC players
Iranian footballers
Iran international footballers
Association football midfielders
2015 AFC Asian Cup players
Tractor S.C. players
Al-Khor SC players
Iranian expatriate footballers
Expatriate footballers in Qatar
Iranian expatriate sportspeople in Qatar
Persian Gulf Pro League players
Qatar Stars League players
Persepolis F.C. players
Sportspeople from Fars province